King Richard III Visitor Centre is a museum in Leicester, England that showcases the life of King Richard III and the story  of the discovery, exhumation, and reburial of his remains in 2012-2015. 

The centre opened in 2014 on the site of the then recently excavated Greyfriars, the medieval friary where the King was buried in 1485 following his death at the Battle of Bosworth Field.

Location
The Centre occupies a former school, Alderman Newton's School, next to the original Social Services car park where King Richard's remains were found during Philippa Langley and the Richard III Society's excavation project, which was started by the University of Leicester Archaeological Services (ULAS) on 25 August 2012 (the remains were found on the first day).

Because of worldwide interest in the discovery, Leicester City Council converted the Victorian school building into a visitor centre. 
The project includes a covered area over the original grave site, which was in the church of the friary. The centre cost £4 million, and was designed by Paul East of Maber Architects.

Access and conservation
The burial site is part of a scheduled monument. In December 2017, Historic England scheduled a significant part of the site of the former friary. While the associated buildings had long been demolished, the site was assessed as having archaeological potential.

Awards
In October 2018, the Visitor Centre was awarded "Best Museum" in the Group Leisure and Travel Awards, after being nominated in the same category as the British Museum and the National Railway Museum.

See also
 Exhumation and reburial of Richard III of England
 Greyfriars, Leicester

References

External links
Official site
Museum opening times

Richard III of England
Archaeological sites in Leicestershire
Biographical museums in Leicestershire
Museums in Leicester
Scheduled monuments in Leicestershire
Visitor centres in England